The following are the national records in athletics in Romania maintained by its national athletics federation: Federatia Romana de Atletism (FRA).

Outdoor

Key to tables:

+ = en route to a longer distance

h = hand timing

A = affected by altitude

NWI = no wind information

Men

Women

Mixed

Indoor

Men

Women

Notes

References
General
Romanian Records – Outdoor 1 August 2019 updated
Romanian Records – Indoor 20 June 2019 updated
Specific

External links
FRA web site

Romania
Records
Athletics
Athletics